Mailbag is an Irish TV programme which was presented by Arthur Murphy and broadcast on RTÉ One for a fourteen-year period, from 1982 to 1996.

The presentation, which was initially 10 minutes in length, dealt with viewers letters concerning RTÉ TV programmes and broadcasting in general. The programme later became established in a half-hour Saturday-evening time slot.

Murphy repeated the Mailbag concept into the 2010s, broadcasting an "E-mail Bag" segment on Today FM radio's The Ray D'Arcy Show.

References

1982 Irish television series debuts
1996 Irish television series endings
1980s Irish television series
1990s Irish television series
Irish television shows
RTÉ 2fm programmes
RTÉ original programming
Today FM programmes